Pyrrhia hedemanni is a moth of the family Noctuidae. It is found on the Korean Peninsula and in northern China, Russian Far East (the Primorye region, Khabarovsk and the Amur region).

External links
Insects of Korea

Heliothinae